The Pigs Can Fly Tour 2016 was a 2016 concert tour by English pop punk band Busted. It was the band's first tour since their split in 2005.

Background

On 5 October 2015, it was reported that Charlie Simpson was set to rejoin Busted, over a decade after his departure lead to their break-up. After this, a photo made its way around the internet that showed the three members of Busted silhouetted in front of a red background. Words appeared to be blurred out at the bottom of the image, but above that was the words "Join us for a special announcement Tuesday November 10th 2015." This implied that the band was reuniting, with further speculation that the three would embark on a reunion tour together. On 10 November 2015, Busted announced a thirteen-date arena tour in the UK and Ireland would take place in May 2016. At the same press conference Busted announced their third studio album. 100,000 tickets were sold in the first hour of being put on sale. Subsequent tour dates were added as a result of high demand.

In early 2016, Busted recorded their third studio album in Los Angeles. On 17 March 2016, Bourne told a fan on Twitter that Busted would decide the release date for their third album that day. It is scheduled for release in the Autumn. The band have also insisted that their reunion is for the long-term; as Bourne told Digital Spy, "We want this to be something that is ongoing. Anything we write now goes towards album four." On 4 April 2016, Busted announced that their tour would be called the Pigs Can Fly Tour 2016 and would include Wheatus and Emma Blackery as special guests. Regarding the title of the tour, Willis told Newsbeat, "The whole pigs can fly thing sums up how we feel about this. There have been times that we thought Busted could never, ever possibly happen and we were quite right in thinking that. But this summarises that anything is possible."

The band announced on 12 April that they were adding a new section of the stage in each show to be known as 'The Pigsty'. Fans that bought tickets for this area would receive exclusive merchandise while also becoming 'an interactive part of the show as it happens live every night'.

On 25 April 2016, it was officially announced that South African drummer Cobus Potgieter, popular on YouTube, would be the supporting drummer for the band during the tour.

Tour dates

Set list

 "Coming Home"
 "Air Hostess"
 "Falling for You"
 "Everything I Knew"
 "You Said No"
 "That Thing You Do"
 "Dawson's Geek"
 "Who's David"
 "Easy"
 "Meet You There"
 "One of a Kind"
 "Thunderbirds Are Go"
 "Sleeping with the Light On"
 "Why" (except for Manchester 3 June and Birmingham 4 June)
 "Crashed the Wedding"
 "What I Go to School For"
 "3AM"
 "Year 3000"

References

External links
Busted website

2016 concert tours
Busted (band)
Concert tours of the United Kingdom
Concert tours of Ireland